The Aotearoa Cafe was the largest Māori discussion forum on the internet. The web forum was run by a group of Māori who are all members and participants in the Tino Rangatiratanga Māori sovereignty movement.

History
The Aotearoa Cafe began in 1998 as the Māori Discussions Online forums hosted on www.culture.co.nz (one of the first Māori websites on the internet).

In 2000 the Aotearoa Cafe became involved in promoting and education about Tā moko — Māori styled tattoo. Several members of the Aotearoa Cafe began their own website https://web.archive.org/web/20041231083857/http://www.tamoko.org.nz/ to address the lack of education out there about this ancient art, and also to address the overwhelming amount of misappropriation going on around the world concerning this art.

By 2001 the Aotearoa Cafe (by that time now hosted on Aotearoalive) became embroiled in cyber terrorism against the toymaker company LEGO, makers of the Bionicle series of toys. Māori accused Lego of being exploiters of Māori language.

Lawyer Maui Solomon also became involved in the dispute and brought claims on behalf of several Māori tribes to Lego. Discussions resulted in Lego saying it had named its toys from Māori and concluded it would no longer use those words in future toys. They also promised to develop a code of conduct for cultural expressions of traditional knowledge.

At the same time, members of the Aotearoa Cafe were involved in abrupt discussions with the administration of BZPower — a Lego Bionicle discussion forum. Māori accused them of continuing to use and allow the use of the word after Lego had conceded that it had misappropriated them and would no longer be using them.  As the debate became more heated, many of the posts made were edited by the administration team in an attempt to maintain what they saw as constructive discussion.  Uncooperative participants in the debate found themselves banned from the BZPower forums.

Retaliation involved the use of a denial of service attack.  Because of the overload, BZPower remained offline while the administration upgraded the forum software.  Although it was never established that the cyber terrorists that levelled the attack against the Bionicle website were in fact members of the Aotearoa Cafe, the forums nevertheless received a retaliation attack from a group calling themselves, Free Speech Worldwide Inc, known to have no connections with BZPower.

Today
Today the Aotearoa Cafe also claims to be involved in assisting Māori find their tribal links, continuing the struggle against neo-colonisation and misappropriation of Māori traditional intellectual property, raising political awareness of the Māori struggle for independence, and with the release of Aocafe Chat, bringing Māori together in online live chat discussions.

Aotearoa Cafe was temporarily shut down as part of the October 2007 New Zealand anti-terror raids, and the webserver was confiscated by the NZ E-Crimes Unit to be later returned. The website is no longer online.

External links
BZPower.com Bionicle fan site
Māori Cyberterrorism Vs LEGO Leads To Reprisals
Transcript of Discussion on BZPower
NEO-COLONIALISM: Internet war brewing over Lego's use of te Reo
Māoris win Lego battle Lego agrees to discontinue use of Māori words.
Ta Moko website
Fony A website by a member of the Aotearoa Cafe about Sony misappropriation of Māori imagery.

Political Internet forums
Māori organisations
Māori politics
Internet properties established in 1998
1998 establishments in New Zealand
New Zealand political websites